Hywel Davies (19 December 1981) is a Welsh professional rugby league footballer, and coach.

Background
Hywel Davies was born in Bridgend, Wales.

International honours
Hywel Davies won a cap for Wales while at Celtic Crusaders 2006(…2007?) 1-cap.

References

External links
Raise Your Game Dedication No pain no gain Hywel Davies
Bulls win clash of champions
Bulls claim Welsh championship
Lockyer pleased with warm-up win

1981 births
Bridgend Blue Bulls players
Crusaders Rugby League players
Living people
Rugby league players from Bridgend
Rugby league props
Wales national rugby league team players
Welsh rugby league coaches
Welsh rugby league players